Gavrilo Martsenkovich known as "Gavrilushka" was a Russian opera actor and singer in the 18th century.

He was a member of the group called the "pevchie" (the singers) of Count Andrey Kirillovich Razumovsky. He played the main role (Cephalus) in the opera by Francesco Araja Цефал и Прокрис (Tsefal i Prokris – Cephalus and Prokris) written to a Russian libretto by Alexander Sumarokov after the Metamorphoses by Ovid, staged at St. Petersburg on March 7, [OS February 27], 1755. Martsenkovich was born in Ukraine and was likely educated at the Hlukhiv school of music.

Year of birth missing
Year of death missing
18th-century male actors from the Russian Empire
18th-century opera singers from the Russian Empire